Wood processing is an engineering discipline in the wood industry comprising the production of forest products, such as pulp and paper, construction materials, and tall oil. Paper engineering is a subfield of wood processing.

The major wood product categories are:  sawn timber, wood-based panels, wood chips, paper and paper products and miscellaneous others including poles and railway sleepers.

Forest product processing technologies have undergone extraordinary advances in some of the above categories. Improvements have been achieved in recovery rates, durability and protection, greater utilization of NTFPs such as various grain stalks and bamboo, and the development of new products such as reconstituted wood-panels. Progress has not been homogenous in all the forest product utilization categories. Although there is little information available on the subjects of technology acquisition, adaptation and innovation for the forest-based industrial sector, it is clear that sawmilling has been far less affected by the spread of innovations than the manufacturing of panel products.

Wood processing produces additives for further processing of timber, wood chips, cellulose and other prefabricated material.

See also
Engineered wood
Wood product
Wood flooring

References

Wood